The large-scaled water monitor (Varanus nuchalis) is a species of monitor lizard.

It is endemic to the Philippines, where it is found on the islands of Cebu, Ticao, Negros, Panay and Masbate.

The species is found in a variety of habitats, primarily mangroves and lowland forests.

References

Varanus
Endemic fauna of the Philippines
Reptiles of the Philippines
Reptiles described in 1872
Taxa named by Albert Günther